Butler Traditional High School is a high school in Louisville, Kentucky, United States.

History
Suda E. Butler High School opened in 1954. It was chosen in 1988 as the second high school in Jefferson County to offer the Traditional Program. In this program the standards of patriotism, morality, and personal integrity are stressed in a structured learning environment. The school has a strict dress code, discipline code, heterogeneous grouping, technology major, and college preparatory curriculum. It is the only school in JCPS to obtain and/or exceed its goal for CATS testing every year during the existence of the yearly examinations. They recently, in the 2009-2010 school year, added the Freshman Academy to their school. Within the next two or three years they plan on changing from the traditional semester to trimester schedule.

In 2009 it was a Host School for Superintendent Sheldon Burman's Superintendent's Student Advisory Council to discuss how JCPS can better prepare high schoolers for life after high school.

Butler Traditional won the Top School Award (WLKY's High School Cribs) in Kentuckiana from WLKY News 32 in 2007. It was also featured on WLKY High School Cribs again in 2009.

Sports

Notable alumni and faculty

 John Bell, Senator, Virginia General Assembly
 Lance Burton, master magician
 Adam Duvall, Major League Baseball outfielder
 Adrienne Johnson, former WNBA player
 Bryce Jones, TV Meteorologist for WDRB News
 Jodie Mudd, former PGA golfer
 Dale Romans, horse trainer (2011 Preakness winner)
 John Wesley Shipp, television and movie actor
 Chris Smith, Major League Baseball pitcher
 Jared Wolfe, Pro Golfer

See also
 Public schools in Louisville, Kentucky

References

Jefferson County Public Schools (Kentucky)
Public high schools in Kentucky
1954 establishments in Kentucky
Educational institutions established in 1954
High schools in Louisville, Kentucky